The English Assassin may refer to:

 The English Assassin: A Romance of Entropy, a 1972 novel by British writer Michael Moorcock
 The English Assassin (Daniel Silva novel), a 2002 spy novel by Daniel Silva